Events from the year 1857 in Canada.

Incumbents
Monarch — Victoria

Federal government
Parliament — 5th

Governors
Governor General of the Province of Canada — Edmund Walker Head
Colonial Governor of Newfoundland — Charles Henry Darling
Governor of New Brunswick — John Manners-Sutton
Governor of Nova Scotia — John Gaspard Le Marchant
Governor of Prince Edward Island — Dominick Daly

Premiers
Joint Premiers of the Province of Canada —
, Canada West Premier
, Canada East Premier 
,
Premier of Newfoundland — Philip Francis Little
Premier of New Brunswick — Charles Fisher
Premier of Nova Scotia — William Young
Premier of Prince Edward Island — John Holl

Events
March 12 — Desjardins Canal disaster - The bridge over Desjardins Canal, near Hamilton, Canada West, collapses under a Great Western Railway passenger train. About 60 people die.
Grand Trunk Railway (Windsor-Montreal) completed, but $7 million in debt.
December 31 - Queen Victoria names Ottawa as capital of the Province of Canada.
The Palliser Expedition begins its exploration of Western Canada.

Births

January to June
February 2 — Alexander Cameron Rutherford, lawyer and politician, first premier of Alberta (died 1941)
February 25 — Robert Bond, politician and Prime Minister of Newfoundland (died 1927)
February 27 — Adelaide Hoodless, educational reformer who founded the Women's Institute (died 1910)
March 17 — Willis Keith Baldwin, politician (died 1935)
June 20 — Adam Beck, politician and hydro-electricity advocate (died 1925)

July to December
July 27 — Ann Stowe-Gullen, doctor
August 15 — Theodore Arthur Burrows, politician and Lieutenant-Governor of Manitoba (died 1929)
August 15 — John Strathearn Hendrie, Lieutenant Governor of Ontario (died 1923)
September 12 — George Halsey Perley, politician and diplomat (died 1938)
October 10 — Cassie Chadwick, fraudster (died 1907)
October 10 — George Johnson Clarke, lawyer, journalist, politician and 14th Premier of New Brunswick (died 1917)
November 25 — Frederick W. A. G. Haultain, politician and 1st Premier of the Northwest Territories (died 1942)

Deaths
February 10 — David Thompson, fur trader, surveyor and map-maker (born 1770)
March 13 — William Amherst, 1st Earl Amherst, diplomat and governor general (born 1773)
September 3 — John McLoughlin, physician, fur trader, and merchant (born 1784)
November 3 — William Fitzwilliam Owen, naval officer, hydrographic surveyor (born 1774)

Full date unknown
Isabella Clark, first wife of John A. Macdonald, premier of the Province of Canada (born 1811)

References 

 
Years of the 19th century in Canada
Canada
1857 in North America